The 1979 European Wrestling Championships  was held from 16 to 21 April 1979 in Bucharest, Romania.

Medal table

Medal summary

Men's freestyle

Men's Greco-Roman

References

External links
Fila's official championship website

Europe
W
European Wrestling Championships
Euro
Sports competitions in Bucharest
1979 in European sport